is a railway station located in the city of Tsuruoka, Yamagata, Japan, operated by the East Japan Railway Company (JR East).

Lines
Fujishima Station is served by the Uetsu Main Line, and is located  rail kilometers from the terminus of the line at Niitsu Station.

Station layout
The station has a single island platform connected to the station building by a footbridge. The station is staffed.

Platforms

History
Fujishima Station was opened on September 1, 1918. With the privatization of the JNR on April 1, 1987, the station came under the control of the East Japan Railway Company.  The station building was rebuilt in 2016.

Passenger statistics
In fiscal 2018, the station was used by an average of 280 passengers daily (boarding passengers only),

Surrounding area
Former Fujishima Town Hall
Shonai Agricultural High School
Fujishima Post Office

See also
List of railway stations in Japan

References

External links

 JR East Station information 

Stations of East Japan Railway Company
Railway stations in Yamagata Prefecture
Uetsu Main Line
Railway stations in Japan opened in 1918
Tsuruoka, Yamagata